The surname Brandys may refer to:

 Anatoli Brandys, Hero of the Soviet Union
 Kazimierz Brandys (1916–2000), Polish essayist and screenwriter
 Marian Brandys (1912–1998), Polish writer
 Pascal Brandys (born 1958), French engineer

See also
Brandýs (disambiguation)
Brandeis
Brandis (surname)
Brandejs